Live @ McCabe's is the fourth live spoken word album by Henry Rollins, released in 1990 on Quarterstick Records. It was reissued with new artwork on 2.13.61 Records on January 5, 2009.  It was recorded on June 9 & 10, 1990 at McCabe's Guitar Shop in Santa Monica, CA. Exene Cervenka and Hubert Selby Jr. performed with Rollins these two nights.

Liner Notes
On June 9 & 10, 1990, I shared the McCabe's stage with Exene Cervenka and Hubert Selby Jr. As I remember, it was a good time. Thanks for listening.

Henry Rollins

Track listing

 Exhaustion – 9:00
 Misunderstanding – 16:00
 I Wish Someone Had Told Me – 36:39
 Travel Tips – 14:28

Credits
Bob Carlson - Recording

1990 live albums
Henry Rollins live albums
Live spoken word albums
Live comedy albums
Spoken word albums by American artists
Quarterstick Records live albums